Continüm Comics was an American comic book publisher which operated between the years 1988 and 1994. Owned and operated by Joseph Naftali, the company's most successful title was The Dark.

Notable creators who worked for Continüm include George Pérez, Joseph Michael Linsner, Larry Stroman, Mark Bright, Dan Panosian, and Janice Chiang.

History 
Established in 1988 in New York City, Continüm published its first tile in 1988, Continüm Presents. In 1990 Continüm rededicated itself to its core titles, The Dark, Foodang, and The Mighty Mites. The company continued until 1994, when it changed its name to August House, Inc.

August House colored other companies' comics and CD-ROMs, and continued to self-publish until 1995. Naftali finally closed the doors on August House when he grew tired of the industry's poor business practices.

Titles 
 Continüm Presents (3 issues, 1988–1989)
 The Dark vol. 1 (4 issues, November 1990–June 1992) — adaptation of a character first featured in the 1980s role-playing game Villains and Vigilantes.
 The Dark vol. 2 (7 issues, July 1993–July 1994)
 The Dark Convention Book
 Foodang: Clown with a Gun (1 issue, July 1994)
 The Mighty Mites (1991, 1993)—parody title of Marvel Comics superheroes; acquired from Eternity Comics

Notes

References 

 
 

1988 establishments in New York City
Publishing companies established in 1988
Comic book publishing companies of the United States
Companies based in New York City
Defunct comics and manga publishing companies
1994 disestablishments in New York (state)
Publishing companies based in New York City